Khaibakh may refer to: 

 Khaybakha, a village in Galanchozhsky District, Chechnya
 Khaibakh massacre, the mass killing of the civilian population of Khaibakh, Chechnya on 27 February 1944